The Phronimidae are a family of amphipod crustaceans, containing two genera:
Phronima Latreille, 1802
Phronimella Claus, 1862

References

External links

Hyperiidea
Taxa named by Constantine Samuel Rafinesque
Crustacean families